Marjorie Moehlenkamp Finlay (October 5, 1928June 1, 2003) was an American opera singer and television personality. She was the maternal grandmother of singer-songwriter Taylor Swift. A coloratura soprano, Finlay performed concert, opera, and supper club singing. After winning a talent contest in 1950, she toured on the ABC radio network show Music With the Girls. Finlay later had her own television program and served as an MC for El Show Pan-Americano in Puerto Rico. She toured South America and released an album in Mexico. She also has a song dedicated to her: "Marjorie" by her granddaughter Taylor.

Life and career 
Marjorie Moehlenkamp was born on October 5, 1928, in Memphis, Tennessee, to Elmer Henry Moehlenkamp of St. Charles, Missouri, and Cora Lee Morrow of Arkansas. She was raised in St. Charles. Three of her paternal great-grandparents were from Germany.

In 1948, Moehlenkamp performed at Mexico Senior High School as a soloist in the Lindenwood Vesper Choir. She earned her Bachelor of Music from Lindenwood University in 1949. Moehlenkamp was in Mu Phi Epsilon, a professional music fraternity. She was a singer in the St. Louis Symphony Orchestra's pop concert at Kiel Auditorium.

In 1950, Moehlenkamp was working as a receptionist at Boatmen's National Bank in St. Louis. She won a talent contest on the ABC network show Music With the Girls. This awarded her a radio spot and she toured on the network radio show for 15 months. During the summer of 1951, Moehlenkamp studied at the Berkshire Music Center and then in New York City on the advice of musician Edwin McArthur. 

She married Robert Finlay, president of Raymond Construction Company, on March 22, 1952, in Palm Beach, Florida. After her marriage, Finlay and her husband moved to Havana, Cuba, where his office was located before relocating to Puerto Rico due to political unrest. They moved to Caracas before returning to Santurce with their children. In Puerto Rico, Finlay had her own television program and performed in concerts, operas, and supper clubs, including a two-week stint at the Caribe Hilton Hotel.

Finlay was the mistress of ceremonies for El Show Pan-Americano on APA-TV in Santurce. She was active in the Pro Arte Societies, a civic music organization. Her Spanish was reportedly "bad" enough to be funny to her audiences. Her television show ran six nights a week for 17 months.

In 1962, Finlay performed at a Kiel Auditorium Pop Concert. Her performance included "Fanciulla È Sbocciato L'Amore" from La rondine and "Jewel song" in addition to pop songs.

Finlay died on June 1, 2003 in Reading, Pennsylvania. Finlay was the mother of Andrea Gardner Swift (née Finlay, born 1958), and through her was maternal grandmother of singer-songwriter Taylor Swift and her brother, actor Austin Swift. Taylor Swift cited Finlay for inspiring her to pursue a career in music. In 2020, Swift released the song "Marjorie" from her ninth studio album Evermore; Swift credited her grandmother with backing vocals which were sampled in the track. In 2022, Swift included a photograph of Finlay in the music video of "Anti-Hero."

Awards and honors

References 

1928 births
2003 deaths
20th-century American women  opera singers
American operatic sopranos
American women television personalities
Radio personalities from St. Louis
Singers from Missouri
Lindenwood University alumni
Taylor Swift
American people of German descent
Singers from Memphis, Tennessee
American expatriates in Cuba